The Strikers were a 1980s funk/disco band from New York City. They had greatest success with two 1981 singles "Body Music" (#4 on the
US dance chart) and "Inch by Inch" (#15). Members included Darryl Gibbs, Howie Young, Milton Brown (later of Warp 9), Robert Rodriguez, Ruben Faison, Robert Gilliom, and Willie Slaughter.

Discography

Studio album
The Strikers (Prelude, 1981)

Compilation album
 12" Mixes (Unidisc, 1991)

Singles

References

External links
 

American disco groups
Musical groups from New York City
Prelude Records artists